The 1994 New Hampshire Wildcats football team was an American football team that represented the University of New Hampshire as a member of the New England Division of the Yankee Conference during the 1994 NCAA Division I-AA football season. In its 23rd year under head coach Bill Bowes, the team compiled a 10–2 record (8–0 against conference opponents), won the Yankee Conference championship, and lost to Appalachian State in the first round of the NCAA Division I-AA playoffs.

Schedule

References

New Hampshire
New Hampshire Wildcats football seasons
Yankee Conference football champion seasons
New Hampshire Wildcats football